The Council of Indian Institutes of Technology, or IIT Council, is the governing body responsible for all of the Indian Institutes of Technology 

The IIT Council comprises the minister-in-charge of technical education in the Union Government (as Chairman), three Members of Parliament, the Chairmen of all IITs, the Directors of all IITs, the Chairman of the University Grants Commission, the Director General of CSIR, the Chairman of IISc, the Director of IISc,  the Joint Council Secretary of Ministry of Human Resource and Development, and three appointees each of the Union Government, AICTE.

References

Indian Institutes of Technology